Mario Chianese (died August 5, 2020) was an Italian painter.

Further reading

References

2020 deaths
Italian male painters
20th-century Italian painters
21st-century Italian painters
20th-century Italian male artists
21st-century Italian male artists